Mansfield, is a small community in the Canadian province of Nova Scotia, in Cumberland County. It is about 10 km long and it mainly consists of wilderness since it is located in a rural setting. It was once an area for pioneer settlements.

References
Mansfield on Destination Nova Scotia

Communities in Cumberland County, Nova Scotia
General Service Areas in Nova Scotia